Muhammad Kara Davud bin Kamal al-Izmiti (b. ? - d. 948 AH/1541 CE), was an Ottoman scholar of Islam known for his work on the exegesis of the Dala'il al-Khayrat: Tevfîk-i Muvaffık il-Hayrât li-Neyl'il-berekât fî Hidmet-i Menbâ'üs-sa'adât, widely known as "Kara Davud". He was born in Izmit and buried in Bursa.

Works
 Talkhis-e Takrir-e Qawanin
 Sharh-e Kasida-e Nuniya
 Malumat (A work on aqida and kalam. The original copy is in the Manasdır Library.)
 Mikdar-ul Qamus
 Risalat Isa-Gujy

References

16th-century Muslim scholars of Islam
Sufism
16th-century writers from the Ottoman Empire